
Mentiroso Lake is a lake in the Pando Department, Bolivia. At an elevation of 140 m, its surface area is 6.9 km2.

References 

Lakes of Pando Department